Arthurs may refer to:

People
Surnames
 Charles Arthurs (1881–1932), English footballer
 Dante Arthurs (born 1984), convicted murderer 
 Declan Arthurs (1965 – 1987), IRA member
 Faye Arthurs, New York City Ballet dancer
 George Arthurs (1875-1944), British songwriter and lyricist 
 Harry Arthurs (born 1935), Canadian lawyer, academic, and academic administrator
 Jack Arthurs (1922-2020), American businessman and politician
 James Arthurs (1866 – 1937), Canadian senator 
 John Arthurs (born 1947), retired American basketball player
 Paul Arthurs (born 1965), member of the defunct British band Oasis
 Wayne Arthurs (tennis) (born 1971), Australian tennis player
 Wayne Arthurs (politician) member of the Legislative Assembly of Ontario

Places
 Arthur's Hill, Newcastle upon Tyne, England
 Arthur's Pass (mountain pass), mountain pass in the Southern Alps of the South Island of New Zealand
 Arthur's Pass, village in the Southern Alps of the South Island of New Zealand
 Arthurs Creek, Victoria, small town in Victoria, Australia
 Arthur's Seat, 250.5 m (822 ft) peak in Edinburgh
 Arthurs Seat, Victoria, hill about 75 km south east of Melbourne, Australia

Other uses
 Arthur's, a former gentlemen's club in London
 Arthur's Magazine, a former American literary magazine

See also

Clan Arthur, the Arthurs, a Scottish clan
Arthur (surname), the Arthurs
Arthur (disambiguation)